Qaffin is a Palestinian town located  northeast of Tulkarm in the Tulkarm Governorate in the northwestern West Bank. The town is an agricultural town. According to the Palestinian Central Bureau of Statistics, its population consisted over 8,387 inhabitants in 2007. The built-up area of the town is 1,000 dunams.

History
Ceramics from the  Byzantine era have been found here.

In 1265, Qaffin was one of the estates given by Sultan Baibars to his followers after his victory over the Crusaders. Half of Qaffin was given to  emir Rukn al-Din Baibars al-Mu'izzi.

Ottoman era
In the 1596 Ottoman tax-records a village named Qaffin appeared part of the nahiya (subdistrict) of Jenin under the liwa' (district) of Lajjun, with a population of 27 Muslim households. They paid taxes on a number of products, including wheat, barley, summer crops, olives, goats and beehives, in addition to occasional revenues and a press for olive oil or grape syrup; a total of 9,000  akçe.

In 1882,  the PEF's Survey of Western Palestine   described the village, then named Kuffin as: "A good sized village on the low hills east of the Plain of Sharon, with a  well on the south side. It has rock cut tombs, and a palm grows near the village."

British Mandate era
In the 1922 census of Palestine conducted  by the British Mandate authorities, Kaffin had a population of 721  Muslims,  increasing in the 1931 census to 1,085  Muslims, living in 255 houses.

In the  1945 statistics  the population of Qaffin, (including Kh. el Aqqaba and Kh. esh Sheik Meisar) was 1,570 Muslims,  and the land area was 23,755  dunams of land  according to an official land and population survey. Of this, 5,863 dunams were plantations and irrigable land, 8,371 were used for cereals, while 40 dunams were built-up (urban) land.

Jordanian era
In the wake of the 1948 Arab–Israeli War, and after the 1949 Armistice Agreements,  Qaffin  came  under Jordanian rule.

In 1961, the population of Qaffin was  2,457.

Post 1967
Since the Six-Day War in 1967, Qaffin has been under Israeli occupation.
 On 7 February, Bader Harashi (20) had quarreled with an Israeli soldier at the Separation barrier  just outside the village, where he was protesting the Trump Middle East peace plan. According to Palestinian reports, the soldier, apparently a Druze, left, came back some minutes later in a jeep, opened the door andshot Harashi dead. According to the IDF investigation, Harashi was shot dead when observed preparing to throw a Molotov cocktail.

References

Bibliography

External links
 Welcome To Qaffein
Survey of Western Palestine, Map 8:     IAA, Wikimedia commons 

Towns in the West Bank
Municipalities of the State of Palestine